Kabad (also Romanized as Kabād, Kabāt, Kobād, Kobāt; also known as Burj-ı-Qanāt and Gū Āt) is a village in Doreh Rural District, in the Central District of Sarbisheh County, South Khorasan Province, Iran. At the 2006 census, its population was 37, in 8 families.

References 

Populated places in Sarbisheh County